Josimar Aldair Quintero Quintero (born 3 February 1997) is an Ecuadorian professional footballer who plays as a midfielder for Real Monarchs SLC.

Club career

Chelsea
Born in Guayaquil, Quintero moved to Spain with his family at the age of five. He joined La Masia, the youth academy of Barcelona, at the age of eight. In 2013, it was reported that Arsenal and Tottenham Hotspur were interested in securing his services, but Quintero opted to join English club Chelsea in July 2014. However, due to paperwork and visa issues, Quintero was unable to play a competitive match for Chelsea until he turned 18. During the 2014–15 under-21 campaign, Quintero became a key figure in Adi Viveash's starting eleven, featuring eighteen times and scoring once in all competitions. He scored his first goal for the Chelsea academy in an UEFA Youth League encounter against Portuguese club Porto. Following his debut season in England, Quintero transitioned from a winger to a central midfielder.

On 5 July 2017, following reports suggesting Quintero was ready to leave Chelsea, he joined Russian club Rostov on a season-long loan. On 20 September 2017, Quintero made his Rostov debut during their cup tie against Volgar Astrakhan, replacing Žan Majer in their 2–0 away victory. On 2 January 2018, Rostov removed Quintero from their official squad list.

Following his return from Rostov, Quintero joined Spanish club Betis B in January 2018 on loan for the remainder of the campaign. The deal also included an option to purchase Quintero at the conclusion of the loan spell. On 4 March 2018, he made his Betis B debut during their 3–1 away defeat against Mérida, replacing Jesús Pozo in the 79th minute.

On 10 August 2018, Quintero agreed to join Spanish third-tier club Lleida Esportiu on a season-long loan.

Espanyol B
On 26 July 2019, Quintero signed for Segunda División B club Espanyol B on a one-year deal with an option of a two-year extension.

Real Monarchs
On 3 December 2020, Quintero moved to USL Championship side Real Monarchs.

Career statistics

References

External links

1997 births
Living people
People from Guayaquil
Ecuadorian footballers
Association football midfielders
FC Barcelona players
Chelsea F.C. players
FC Rostov players
Betis Deportivo Balompié footballers
Lleida Esportiu footballers
Real Monarchs players
Ecuadorian expatriate footballers
Ecuadorian expatriate sportspeople in Spain
Expatriate footballers in Spain
Expatriate footballers in England
Expatriate footballers in Russia
Expatriate soccer players in the United States
RCD Espanyol B footballers